The House that Jack Built: La Maison Que Jacques A Batie is a 1958 picture book written and illustrated by Antonio Frasconi. The book tells the story of This Is the House That Jack Built in English and French. The book was a recipient of a 1959 Caldecott Honor for its illustrations.

References 

1958 children's books
American picture books
Caldecott Honor-winning works